William Burn  (20 December 1789 – 15 February 1870) was a Scottish architect. He received major commissions from the age of 20 until his death at 81. He built in many styles and was a pioneer of the Scottish Baronial Revival,often referred to as the golden age of Scottish architecture.

Life
Burn was born in Rose Street in Edinburgh, the son of architect Robert Burn and his wife Janet Patterson. He was the fourth born and the eldest survivor of the 16 children born.

William was educated at the High School in Edinburgh's Old Town. He started training with Sir Robert Smirke in London in 1808. This is where worked on Lowther Castle with C.R. Cockerell, Henry Roberts, and Lewis Vulliamy.

After training with the architect Sir Robert Smirke, designer of the British Museum, he returned to Edinburgh in 1812. Here he established a practice from the family builders' yard. His first independent commission was in Renfrewshire. In 1812 he designed the exchange assembly rooms for the Greenock. His father gave him the commission for a church in North Leith, this commission is what made his career and gave him a reputation.

On August 3rd, 1815 Burn married Elizabeth MacVicar. They lost 2 out of 7 children.

In 1816 Burn entered a competition to complete Robert Adam's University. He lost the competition to William Henry Playfair. This made him hate competitions and Playfair. After this is when he started designing country houses. These house have Burn a bigger career than another Scottish architect before him.

In 1827 he was elected a Fellow of the Royal Society of Edinburgh, unusual for an architect, his proposer being James Skene. He resigned in 1845 following his move to London. 

In 1825, he took on a pupil, David Bryce. In 1841 they went into partnership together. David ran the Scottish office and Burn ran the English office. By 1850 the Scottish office was much more profitable and the partnership ended. From 1844 he worked in London, where he took on his nephew John Macvicar Anderson as a partner.

In the 1830s he was living and working at 131 George Street in the New Town. 

He moved to London in 1844. He opened his practice on Stratton Street.

Burn was a master of many styles, but all are typified by well-proportioned simplicity externally and frequent stunning interiors. He was a pioneer of the Scottish baronial Revival with Helen's Tower (1848), Castlewellan Castle (1856), and Balintore Castle (1859).

Freemasonry
It has not been ascertained where Burn became a Freemason but he was the Grand Architect of the Grand Lodge of Scotland from 1827–44 when his pupil, David Bryce, was named as 'joint' Grand Architect. Both served the Grand Lodge of Antient Free and Accepted Masons of Scotland, in that joint capacity until 1849. Thereafter, David Bryce was Grand Architect in his own right until 1876.

Death
He died at 6 Stratton Street in Piccadilly, London, and is buried in Kensal Green Cemetery just on the edge of the path to the north-west of the Anglican Chapel.

Trained under Burn
William Burn had many pupils:
John Honeyman
David Bryce
John Lessels
George Meikle Kemp
Thomas Brown
James Campbell Walker
William Eden Nesfield
David MacGibbon

David Bryce went on to perfect the Scottish Baronial Revival style of architecture.

Works
Burn was a prolific architect and happy to turn his hand to a variety of styles. He designed churches, castles, public buildings, country houses (as many as 600), monuments and other structures, mainly in Scotland but also in England and Ireland. His works include among others:

Scotland
 Ardanaiseig House, near Kilchrenan, Argyll
Balintore Castle, Angus (1859) Scottish Baronial
The Binns, remodelled for the Dalyell family (1811) Gothic
Blairquhan Castle, South Ayrshire (1821) Gothic
Blantyre Monument, Erskine (1825)
Camperdown House, Dundee (1820) Greek Revival
Castle Menzies (1840) new wing
Carstairs House, South Lanarkshire (1820–1823) Gothic
 Corstorphine Old Parish Church (1828) – considered too radical and returned to its medieval orientation in 1905
Dornoch Cathedral major reconstruction (1835–1837)
The Duke of Gordon's Monument, Elgin, Moray (1839)
Dundas Castle, near Edinburgh (1818) Gothic
Dunira, Perthshire (1852) demolished
Dupplin Castle (1828) demolished
The Edinburgh Academy (1824)
 Gallanach House, near Oban, Argyll (1814)
Garscube House, Dunbartonshire (1827)
House of Falkland, Falkland, Fife (1839-1844)
Inverness Castle, Inverness (1836) Gothic
John Watson's Institution now the Scottish National Gallery of Modern Art, Edinburgh (1825) Neoclassic
 Keir Parish Church, Keirmill Village, Dumfriesshire (1813)
Lauriston Castle, Edinburgh, Scotland, (west range only) (1827) Jacobean
Lude House, Blair Atholl, Perth and Kinross (1837)

Murray Royal Lunatic Asylum, Perth (1827)
North Leith Parish Church, Madeira Street, Leith (1814) Neoclassical
Church of St John the Evangelist, Edinburgh (1818) Gothic
 The Melville Monument in the centre of St Andrew Square, Edinburgh (1820–3) (topped by a statue by Robert Forrest)
 New Abbey Church, Dunfermline, Fife (1821)
Madras College, St Andrews (1832) Jacobean

England
Adderstone Hall, near Lucker, Northumberland (1819) Georgian Grecian
Cliveden, Buckinghamshire
Harlaxton Manor, Grantham, Lincolnshire
Stoke Rochford Hall, Lincolnshire (1841–43).
Lynford Hall, Norfolk Jacobean
Montagu House, Whitehall, London, French Renaissance, demolished
Prestwold Hall, Loughborough, Leicestershire (1842) Classical
Revesby Abbey, Lincolnshire (1845), Elizabethan-Jacobean
 South Rauceby Hall, South Rauceby Lincolnshire (1842)
The Old Deanery, Lincoln, (1847)
Sandon Hall, Staffordshire, (1852), Jacobean

Ireland
Bangor Castle, County Down, Northern Ireland (1852) Elizabethan-Jacobean
Castlewellan Castle, County Down, Northern Ireland (1856) Scottish Baronial
Dartrey Castle, near Rockcorry in County Monaghan (1840s) Elizabethan-Jacobean, demolished
Helen's Tower, Clandeboye Estate near Bangor (1848) Scottish Baronial
Muckross House, Killarney, County Kerry (1843) Tudor
Conservatory at Killruddery House (1852)

Gallery

References

Further reading
 Walker, David (1984): William Burn and the influence of Sir Robert Smirke and William Wilkins on Scottish Greek Revival Design, 1810–40 in Scottish Pioneers of the Greek Revival, The Scottish Georgian Society, Edinburgh, pp 3–35

External links
Gazetteer for Scotland- William Burn

1789 births
1870 deaths
Architects from Edinburgh
People educated at the Royal High School, Edinburgh
Burials at Kensal Green Cemetery
Scottish baronial architecture